Paul Alexandre Alfred Leroy (1860 in Paris – 1942) was a French painter noted for Orientalist works. He was a founding member of the Société des Peintres Orientalistes Français (Society for French Orientalist Painters) and designed the Society's first logo.

Life and career
French by birth, Leroy spent his childhood in Odessa, where his father had a business. He lived in Odessa until age 17 years, which gave him interest in the East. In Paris, he studied at the École des Beaux-Arts. He first exhibited in 1882 and was awarded a medal.

At Beaux Artes, he met Georges Landelle (1860-1898), an Orientalist painter and the pair became life-long friends. In 1885 he visited Turkey and Egypt, with Landelle and Landelle's father. In 1886 journeyed to Tunisia and Algeria, returning to the country's southern region several times during the 1880s and 1890s. During this period, Leroy studied the Arabic language, which enabled him to use the Arabic script effectively in a number of paintings and lithographs.

In 1893, Leroy, along with artists, Maurice Bompard, Eugène Girardet, Alphonse-Étienne Dinet, Jean-Léon Gérôme, Jean-Joseph Benjamin-Constant and art historian,  Léonce Bénédite, became founding members of the Société des Peintres Orientalistes Français which was responsible for promoting Orientalist art, mounting exhibitions and generally encouraging artists who wished to travel to the Orient. The Society appropriated a logo designed by Leroy and used it on all their correspondence, catalogs, posters and menus. The logo incorporated the sickle moon, the star of David and the black hand of Fatma. The image represents Frenchmen as outsiders, who nevertheless dream of cultural integration and synthesis.  Leroy's lithographs were also used extensively in the Society's graphic artwork including menus, posters and brochures.

Work
During his career, LeRoy painted both Orientalist scenes and religious paintings. He worked in oil, watercolours and also made lithographs.

Leroy's Portrait de sa mere is a parody of Whistler's Portrait of the Painter's Mother and won the Prix du Salon in 1884.

Select list of paintings

 A Harem Beauty n.d.
 The Harem Dance n.d. 
 Inside the Harem n.d.
 A Kabyle Student, 1892
 The Girls of Atlas, 1901
 The Musicians 
 Musical Interlude 
 Woman Embrodering 
 An Oasis in the Sahara
 Martyr d'Amour 
 Porttrait of a Young Girl 
 Young Women at the Cemetery
 Weaver in Biskra, Algeria

Gallery

See also
 List of Orientalist artists
 Orientalism
 Société des Peintres Orientalistes Français

References

19th-century French painters
French male painters
20th-century French painters
20th-century French male artists
Orientalist painters
1860 births
1942 deaths
19th-century French male artists